Manna Music was founded in 1955 by Tim Spencer as a song publishing company. During the early 1970s through the mid 1980s it included its own label, Manna Records.

Manna Music
The publishing company has worked with the likes of Audrey Mieir, Doris Akers, André Crouch, Dan Barker, Danny Lee Stutzman, Andrew Culverwell, Phil Kerr, Stuart Hamblen, Jack Holcomb, and Ralph Carmichael.

In the early days Manna attained ownership of "How Great Thou Art", written by Stuart K. Hine. According to ASCAP, the song has been recorded by many mainstream and gospel artists, including Elvis Presley, Lee Greenwood, The Imperials, The Oak Ridge Boys, The Florida Boys, and George Beverly Shea.

Hal Spencer later took over the company. Hal Spencer accepted the 1979 ASCAP Award for Manna Music as Gospel Publisher of the Year.

Manna Records
In the early 1970s, Manna Music formed the label Manna Records and began producing albums by Ralph Carmichael and others.

Manna also produced a number of successful musicals, such as Mary Had a Little Lamb, Life Just Keeps On Happening, Happy Birthday, Merry Christmas,  His Fleece Was White As Snow, In His Presence, and the musical, Sing Christmas.

In the mid 1980s the label Manna Records shut down. However the parent company Manna Music Inc, remains active today.

Songs
 "How Great Thou Art" – Stuart K. Hine
 "Sweet, Sweet Spirit" – Doris Akers
 "The Blood Will Never Lose Its Power" – Andraé Crouch
 "Through It All" – Andraé Crouch
 "Heaven" – Andraé Crouch
 "Spread a Little Love Around" – Danny Lee Stutzman
 "Come On Ring Those Bells" – Andrew Culverwell
 "I've Never Seen the Righteous Forsaken" – Archie Dennis, Jr

Artists
 Dale Evans
 Doris Akers
 Lillie Knauls
 The Kathryn Kuhlman Choir
 June Wade & The Country Congregation
 The Crownsmen
 The Californians Quartet
 Audrey Mieir
 Andrew Culverwell
 The Second Coming

See also
 List of record labels

References
 https://web.archive.org/web/20101006063310/http://www.rpinet.com/cmd.html Resource Publications, "The Christian Music Directories" formerly "The Recording Locator"
 https://web.archive.org/web/20120207004729/http://www.mannamusicinc.com/mmi.htm – History of Manna Music Inc.
 https://web.archive.org/web/20080408042710/http://www.mpa.org/directories/music_publishers/show/247 – Music Publishers Association Website listing
 https://web.archive.org/web/20080409114828/http://www.mymusicway.com/labels/manna.html – Another listing about the history of Manna Music Inc.
 http://www.ascap.com/ace/search.cfm?requesttimeout=300&mode=results&searchstr=380081849&search_in=i&search_type=exact&search_det=t,s,w,p,b,v&results_pp=10&start=1 – ASCAP Website link to "How Great Thou Art"
 https://web.archive.org/web/20080408042710/http://www.mpa.org/directories/music_publishers/show/247 – Music Publishers Association of The United States

External links
  

Music publishing companies of the United States
American record labels
Gospel music record labels
Record labels established in 1955
Publishing companies established in 1955
American companies established in 1955